The 1990–91 Scottish Challenge Cup was the inaugural season of the competition, which was also known as the B&Q Centenary Cup for sponsorship reasons. It was competed for by the 28 member clubs of the Scottish Football League Division One and Two.

The final was played on 11 November 1990, between Ayr United and Dundee at Fir Park in Motherwell. Dundee won 3–2 after extra time to become the first winners of the cup.

Schedule

First round 
Dundee, East Stirlingshire, Hamilton Academical and Stranraer entered the second round.

Source: statto.com

Second round 

Source: statto.com

Quarter-finals

Semi-finals

Final

References

External links 
 statto.com Scottish Challenge Cup fixtures and results on statto.com
 Scottish Football League Scottish Challenge Cup on Scottish Football League website
 Soccerbase Scottish League Challenge Cup on Soccerbase.com
 ESPN Soccernet  Scottish League Challenge Cup homepage on ESPN Soccernet
 BBC Sport – Scottish Cups Challenge Cup on BBC Sport

Scottish Challenge Cup seasons
Challenge Cup
Scottish Challenge Cup